Keith Baker may refer to:

Keith Baker (game designer) (born 1969), American game designer
Keith Baker (gridiron football) (born 1957), American football player active in the Canadian Football League
Keith Baker (footballer) (born 1956), English soccer player
Keith Baker (musician) (born 1948), American drummer for Uriah Heep
Keith Michael Baker (born 1938), British historian
Keith Baker (fl. 1980s–1990s), Australian High Commissioner to Vanuatu from 1988–1990

See also
Keith Bakker (born 1960), American-Dutch former mental health practitioner and convicted criminal